Duttapukur (also known as Nebhadai Duttapukur) is a census town in the Barasat I CD block in the Barasat Sadar subdivision in the North 24 Parganas district in the Indian state of West Bengal. It is a part of Kolkata Urban Agglomeration.

Geography

Location

Duttapukur is located in the Ganges Brahmaputra delta region in the district of North 24 parganas, West Bengal state in the Eastern part of India. A tributary of Bidyadhari River known as Suti flows through Duttapukur.  Duttapukur is 30 km from Sealdah & 35 km from Howrah, 7 km from Barasat and 32 km from Bongaon on the Sealdah-Bangaon section of Eastern Railway

As per District Census Handbook 2011, Duttapukur covered an area of 3.29 km2 

Duttapukur, Shibalaya, Chandrapur, Gangapur, Chalta Baria and Joypul form a cluster of census towns in the northern part of the CD block. The entire cluster has a very high density of population. (See the infobox of each census town for density of population).

Area overview
The area covered in the map alongside is largely a part of the north Bidyadhari Plain. located in the lower Ganges Delta. The country is flat. It is a little raised above flood level and the highest ground borders the river channels.54.67% of the people of the densely populated area lives in the urban areas and 45.33% lives in the rural  areas.

Note: The map alongside presents some of the notable locations in the subdivision. All places marked in the map are linked in the larger full screen map.

Civic administration

Police station
Duttapukur police station covers an area of 104.34 km2 and serves a total population of 292,268. It has jurisdiction over Barasat I CD block. There is a police outpost at Kadambagachhi.

Demographics
 India census, Nebadhai Duttapukur (a census town had a population of 25,557; of this, 12,902 are male, 12,655 female .

 India census, Nebadhai Duttapukur had a population of 19,882. Males constitute 51% of the population and females 49%. Nebadhai Duttapukur has an average literacy rate of 77%, higher than the national average of 59.5%; with 82% of the males and 73% of females literate. 9% of the population is under 6 years of age.

Administration
Duttapukur is a census town under Barasat I (community development block) of Barasat sadar subdivision. Duttapukur I, Duttapukur II and Kashimpur gram panchayats are responsible for development of Duttapukur. It falls under the Assembly constituency of Amdanga (Vidhan Sabha constituency) and Barrackpore (Lok Sabha constituency).

Education
There are many primary and higher secondary schools. Most of the schools are run by the state government. All of the secondary schools are affiliated with West Bengal Board of Secondary Education and the higher secondary schools are affiliated to the West Bengal Council of Higher Secondary Education. Students usually choose from one of three streams — Arts, Commerce, or Science, though vocational streams are also available. Institute for higher education is not available in Duttapukur. Students have to go to nearby towns like Barasat, Madhyamgram, Birati, Habra or to Kolkata to attend college.

Higher secondary schools
 Nebadhai High School (Boys)
 Duttapukur Mahesh Vidyapith (Boys)
 Dighara Haradayal Vidyapith
 Duttapukur Adarsha Vidyapith
 Faldi High School 
 Kashimpur High School (Boys)
 Nebadhai Balika Vidyalaya(girls)

Secondary schools
 Kashimpur Balika Vidyalaya (Girls)
 Jadav Tarafder Smriti Madhyamik Siksha Kendra
 Meghnad Ghosh Madhyamik Siksha Kendra
 Rajiv Gandhi Memorial School (Co-Edu)

Primary school
 Children's Model School
Chaltaberia Free Primary School
 Dighara Haradayal Vidyapith (Primary)
 Duttapukur Adarsha F.P School 
 Kalipada Sriti Siksha Mandir
 Kashimpur Prathamik Vidyalaya
 Mahesh Vidyapith Prathamik Vidyalaya
 Nebadhui Prathamik Vidyalaya
 Shibamani Prathamik Vidyalaya
 Digha Sussex Trust F.P School
 Duttapukur Dakshinpara Primary School
 Sabuj Asor
 Nivedita Sisu Siksha Niketan

College
 Monalisha B.Ed College

Healthcare
North 24 Parganas district has been identified as one of the areas where ground water is affected by arsenic contamination. In this connection, Rotary Club of Calcutta has taken a project purifying the rain water is to be given to the Kashimpur Boys & Girl's High school both.

Local clubs also conducts health awareness programs.

Government Health Center:
 Duttapukur Health Center (Hospital Road, Duttapukur)
 Duttapukur Sub-Health Center (Gangapur-Halderbagan, Duttapukur)
 Duttapukur Sub-Health Center (Nebadhai, Duttapukur)
 Duttapukur Sub-Health Center (Digha Daspara, Kashimpur, Duttapukur)
 Duttapukur Sub-Health Center (Jirat, Kashimpur, Duttapukur )

Economy

Commuters
The proximity to Kolkata helps residents commute daily to Kolkata.

As per 2011 census, a large proportion of people in Barasat I CD Block earn their livelihood as ‘Other works’, which include office, factory, transport, professional employment and business. (See Barasat I for details). Around a total of 32 lakh people from all around the city commute to Kolkata daily for work. In the Sealdah-Bangaon section there are 58 trains that carry commuters from 24 railway stations. In the Seadah-Hasnabad sections 32 trains carry commuters from 30 stations.

Markets
Besides two large markets known as Duttapukur Station Market and Hatkhola Bazar. Duttapukur town consists four of Daily Vegetable Market at Nebadhai, Duttapukur Station, Duttapukur Hatkhola & Gangapur Area. Side by side it's also have two of Bi-weekly Hat at Duttapukur Hatkhola (One of the largest Vegetable - Fruits & Fish Market for bulk cum retail customer in North 24 Parganas and Jublighata Hat. Recently the Government of West Bengal opened a new Vegetable Market at Gangapur. (i.e. Duttapukur Krishi Biponi Kendra). One new Shopping Mall has also been opened at Duttapukur Tatultala, More supermarket

Banks
Seven Nationalised Banks & several ATMs are located at Duttapukur in different locations of the town.

Bank of Baroda Duttapukur Branch (Duttapukur Hatkhola)
State Bank of India Duttapukur Branch (Duttapukur Hatkhola)
Punjab National Bank Duttapukur Branch (Duttapukur Station Road, Sub Branch at Joypul) (Formally United Bank of India)
 Bank of India Kashimpur Branch (1 No. Rail Gate, Duttapukur, Nilganj Road & Shibalaya Branch (Opposite Duttapukur Police Station)
 ICICI Bank Duttapukur Branch (Duttapukur Hatkhola) 
 Axis Bank Duttapukur Branch (Duttapukur Hatkhola)
Bandhan Bank Duttapukur Branch (Duttapukur-Nilganj Road, Near Gangapur Chowmatha)

ATMs
Bank of Baroda ATM (1. Duttapukur Hatkhola),
Punjab National Bank ATM (1. Duttapukur Station Road, 2. Duttapukur Hatkhola),
State Bank of India ATM (1. Duttapukur Hatkhola  2. Duttapur Hatkhola, 3. Hospital Road),
Bank of India ATM (1. Duttapukur-Nilganj Road at the Ground Floor of BOI Shibalaya Branch 2.Opposite Of Animal Hospital in Duttapukur Nilganj Road),
ICICI Bank ATM (1. Duttapukur Hatkhola),
Axis Bank ATM (1. Duttapukur Hatkhola 2. Railway Station Road 3. Nilganj Road Near Duttapukur 1 No. Railway Gate),
HDFC Bank ATM (1. Duttapukur Hatkhola 2. Duttapukur Station Road)

Climate
The climate is tropical — like the rest of the Gangetic West Bengal. The hallmark is the Monsoon — from early June to mid September. The weather remains dry during the winter (mid November to mid February) and humid during summer.

Temperature : 42 °C in May (Max) and 9 °C in January (Min) Relative Humidity: Between 55% in March & 98% in July.

Rainfall: 1,579mm (Normal)

See also
Map of Barasat I CD Block on Page 393 of District Census Handbook.

References

Cities and towns in North 24 Parganas district
Neighbourhoods in Kolkata
Kolkata Metropolitan Area